Baroness Kennedy may refer to:

 Alicia Kennedy, Baroness Kennedy of Cradley (born 1969), British Labour politician
 Helena Kennedy, Baroness Kennedy of The Shaws (born 1950), Scottish barrister, broadcaster and Labour politician

See also 
 Lord Kennedy (disambiguation)